Arnold T. Morgado, Jr. (born March 27, 1952) was a professional football running back in the NFL for the Kansas City Chiefs. He graduated from Punahou School in 1971; in 1994, he was inducted into the Punahou Athletic Hall of Fame.

Morgado later entered politics, serving in the Hawaii House of Representatives and then on the Honolulu City Council as its chairman.

See also
Hōkūlea - Arnold Morgado sailed aboard her in 1987, from Papeete to Tautira, Tahiti, French Polynesia

Footnotes

1952 births
Living people
American athlete-politicians
American football running backs
Punahou School alumni
Michigan State Spartans football players
Hawaii Rainbow Warriors football players
Kansas City Chiefs players
Hōkūlea
Hawaii people of Portuguese descent